Miss Brazil World 2006 was the 17th edition of the Miss Brazil World pageant and 1st under MMB Productions & Events. The contest took place on July 30, 2006. Representatives from various cities all throughout Brazil competed for the Brazilian crown for Miss World. Jane Borges of Goiânia, Goiás was crowned Miss Brazil World at the end of the contest by Miss World 2005, Unnur Birna Vilhjálmsdóttir of Iceland. Borges succeeded outgoing titleholder Patrícia Reginato of Paraná. Borges represented Brazil at Miss World 2006. The contest was held at the Music Channel Auditorium in Curitiba, Paraná, Brazil.

Results

{| class="wikitable"
|-
! Final Results
! Contestant
|-
| Miss Brazil World 2006
|
 Goiânia - Jane Borges
|-
| 1st Runner-Up
|
 Cuiabá - Vanessa de Jesus
|-
| 2nd Runner-Up
|
 Ouro Preto - Tamara Almeida
|-
| 3rd Runner-Up
|
 Guarapari - Mariana Bridi
|-
| 4th Runner-Up
| Pinhais - Clarissa Caetano
|-
| Top 10| Astorga - Ana Paula Apolônio Balneário Camboriú - Daniela Martins Joinville - Larissa Reinert Minatto Maringá - Anelize Garcia Umuarama - Vivian Noronha Cia
|-
| Top 24| Belo Horizonte - Carla Lara Brasília - Patrícia Lírio Curitiba - Priscila Ghedin Florianópolis - Michele Koerich Foz do Iguaçu - Janaína Macêdo Jaboatão dos Guararapes - Leila Roots Jandaia do Sul - Amanda Bocchi Niterói - Alessandra Paulino Palotina - Paola Lettrari Porto Alegre - Catiane Menezes Toledo - Thays Rosa Três Lagoas - Caroline Alcamin Venâncio Aires - Daniela Silva Vitória - Aline Avancini
|}

Special Awards

Challenge Events

Beauty with a Purpose

Miss Talent

Delegates
The delegates for Miss Brazil World 2006 were: Astorga - Ana Paula Apolônio Balneário Camboriú - Daniela Martins Belo Horizonte - Carla Lara Brasília - Patrícia Lírio Campo Grande - Nádia Bronze Canela - Anny Foerster Canoas - Bruna Soares Sawatori Cascavel - Eliane Dias Cuiabá - Vanessa de Jesus Curitiba - Priscila Ghedin Florianópolis - Michele Koerich Fortaleza - Juliana de Sousa Meireles Foz do Iguaçu - Janaína Macêdo Guarapari - Mariana Bridi Goiânia - Jane Borges Itapoá - Pâmela Cristina Neves Jaboatão dos Guararapes - Leila Roots Jandaia do Sul - Amanda Bocchi João Monlevade - Tamara Lacerda Joaquim Nabuco - Tássia Oliveira Joinville - Larissa Reinert Minatto Manaus - Natascha Barbosa Marechal Floriano - Jakeline Lemke Maringá - Anelize Garcia Niterói - Alessandra Paulino Lopes da Silva Ouro Preto - Tamara Almeida Palotina - Paola Lettrari Pato Branco - Ana Luiza Horn Pinhais - Clarissa Majoriê Caetano Piraquara - Nilza Karla Beetz de Faria Porto Alegre - Catiane Menezes Recife - Eveline Aragão de Albuquerque Rio de Janeiro - Danielle Brito Salvador - Loraine Navarro Gimenez Taboão da Serra - Margrid Holschuh Tangará - Patrícia Borges Camargo Toledo - Thays Rosa Três Lagoas - Caroline Alcamin Umuarama - Vivian Noronha Cia Venâncio Aires - Daniela Silva Vitória' - Aline Avancini

References

External links
 Official site (in Portuguese)''

2006
2006 in Brazil
2006 beauty pageants